Neufahrn may refer to the following municipalities or parts of municipalities:

Neufahrn bei Freising, in Upper Bavaria, Germany
Neufahrn (Niederbayern), in Lower Bavaria, Germany
 Neufahrn (Egling), part of the municipality Egling, Upper Bavaria, Germany
 Neufahrn (Mettenheim), part of the municipality Mettenheim, Upper Bavaria, Germany
 Neufahrn (Schäftlarn), part of the municipality Schäftlarn, Upper Bavaria, Germany
 Neufahrn (Walpertskirchen), part of the municipality Walpertskirchen, Upper Bavaria, Germany
 Neufahrn (Neumarkt am Wallersee), part of the municipality Neumarkt am Wallersee, Austria